Kharan is a town in Kharan District, Balochistan, Pakistan. It is located at 28°35'0N 65°25'0E with an altitude of 692 metres (2273 feet). It is also division headquarters of Rakhshan Division. It is populated with many Baloch tribes and clans. 

Former Federal Shariat Court and Balochistan High Court chief justice Mohammad Noor Meskanzai belongs to this town.

Demographics
The total population of town in the 1981 Pakistan Census was recorded as 10,472 that increases up to 27,806 according to the Census of 1998. As per the 2017 Census of Pakistan, the population of the town was recorded as 44,655 with an increase of about 60.6% in just 19 years.
Kharan is a dry land.

References

Populated places in Kharan District
Tehsils of Balochistan, Pakistan